The  was a Japanese Dai-ichi Taifuku Maru-class built and operated cargo ship and hellship.

Hellship
Between October 27 and November 27, 1942 it transported 1200 Allied prisoners of war (POWs) and 600 Japanese Army troops between Singapore and Moji, Japan. Twenty-seven prisoners died during the journey, the result of poor hygiene conditions on the ship. A further 130 were carried off the ship on stretchers and as many as 100 died later.

On 24 December 1943, the USS Gurnard sunk the Tōfuku Maru off the east coast of Honshu, Japan.

War crimes trial
During a Singapore War Crimes trial, Ship's Master Shiro Otsu and Serjeant Major Eiji Yoshinari were tried for war crimes that caused the deaths of prisoners on the voyage. During the trial it was found that the POWs (a mix of American, Dutch, Australian and British) were crammed into two holding areas with an average area of 5 men per 6 square foot and that toiletry facilities and  foods were insufficient for their needs. On 11 June 1947, Otsu was found guilty and Yoshinari was acquitted.

Related links
 Mitsushima POW Camp
 Kanose POW Camp
 List of Japanese hell ships

External links
 Wrecksite page for the SS Tofuku Maru
 The OTSU Case, University of California Berkeley War Crimes Study Centre

References

1919 ships
Japanese hell ships
Ships sunk by American submarines
South West Pacific theatre of World War II
World War II passenger ships of Japan
World War II merchant ships of Japan